Lionel Trains: On Track is a video game released for the Nintendo DS on December 6, 2006, licensed by Lionel Trains. The gameplay is very similar to Sid Meier's Railroad Tycoon series of computer games. In the game, you are the head of an unspecified railroad, and your objective is to connect different cities together through rail, using the funds you start off with, and later earn. There are several separate modes of gameplay, with varying objectives.

Lionel Trains received "generally unfavorable reviews", according to Metacritic.

See also 
 3D Ultra Lionel Traintown: Windows game licensed by Lionel LLC

References

2006 video games
Nintendo DS games
Nintendo DS-only games
Railroad business simulation video games
Strategy video games
Lionel, LLC
Destination Software games
Video games scored by Jake Kaufman
Video games developed in the United States
Black Lantern Studios games
Single-player video games